The following radio stations broadcast on FM frequency 106.1 MHz:

Argentina
 Aprender in Buenos Aires
 Atomika in San Martín, Buenos Aires
 LRJ925 Capilla de Rodríguez in Villa Ascasubi, Córdoba
 Enterprice in Mendoza
 Imagen in San Antonio De Areco, Buenos Aires
 OH! in Casilda, Santa Fe
 Plus in Buenos Aires
 Radio María in Las Toninas, Buenos Aires
 Radio María in Villa Cañas, Santa Fe 
 Rio in Río Segundo, Córdoba
 Uno in Franck, Santa Fe
 Víctor in Córdoba

Australia
 5TCB in Bordertown, South Australia
 ABC Classic FM in Newcastle, New South Wales
 ABC Classic FM in Brisbane, Queensland
 ABC North and West SA in Coober Pedy, South Australia
 Triple J in Longreach, Queensland

Canada (Channel 291)
 CBAM-FM in Moncton, New Brunswick
 CBAX-FM-3 in Yarmouth, Nova Scotia
 CBCS-FM-1 in Temagami, Ontario
 CBGA-11-FM in Mont-Louis, Quebec
 CBSI-FM-24 in Baie-Comeau, Quebec
 CFAF-FM in La Grande-1, Quebec
 CFIT-FM in Airdrie, Alberta
 CFKX-FM in High Level, Alberta
 CHEZ-FM in Ottawa, Ontario
 CHWE-FM in Winnipeg, Manitoba
 CIEU-FM-1 in Paspebiac, Quebec
 CIMJ-FM in Guelph, Ontario
 CIMO-FM in Magog, Quebec
 CKCR-FM in Revelstoke, British Columbia
 CKHH-FM in Hudson's Hope, British Columbia
 CKJM-FM in Chéticamp, Nova Scotia
 CKKX-FM in Peace River, Alberta
 CKLM-FM in Lloydminster, Alberta/Saskatchewan
 CKSE-FM in Estevan, Saskatchewan
 CKWC-FM in Whale Cove, Nunavut
 VF2145 in Arctic Red River, Northwest Territories
 VF2161 in Haines Junction, Yukon
 VF2219 in Seton Portage, British Columbia
 VF2259 in Ferry Hill, Yukon
 VF2536 in Grand Forks, British Columbia
 VF2567 in Clearwater, British Columbia
 VF7308 in Oakville, Ontario

China 

 CNR The Voice of China in Beijing and Zhengzhou

Malaysia
 Ai FM in Kuantan, Pahang and Taiping, Perak
 Suria in Kota Bharu, Kelantan

Mexico
 XHCDMX-FM in Mexico City
 XHCHIL-FM in Chilchota, Michoacán
 XHEDI-FM in Oaxaca-San Sebastián Tutla, Oaxaca
 XHETF-FM in Veracruz, Veracruz
 XHGCY-FM in Juchitán de Zaragoza, Oaxaca
 XHITS-FM in Monterrey, Nuevo León
 XHLTZ-FM in Aguascalientes, Aguascalientes
 XHPCA-FM in Pachuca, Hidalgo
XHRRA-FM in Fresnillo, Zacatecas
XHSCCN-FM in Morelia, Michoacan
XHSCEU-FM in Huajuapan de León, Oaxaca
XHSCFX-FM in Tecozautla, Hidalgo
 XHSCID-FM in Agua Dulce, Veracruz
 XHSU-FM in Chihuahua, Chihuahua
 XHTUT-FM in Villa de Tututepec de Melchor Ocampo, Oaxaca
 XHUAEM-FM in Cuernavaca, Morelos

United States (Channel 291)
 KBKS-FM in Tacoma, Washington
 KBZI in Mooreland, Oklahoma
 KCEV-LP in Marshall, Texas
 KCFA in Arnold, California
 KCII-FM in Washington, Iowa
 KEAC-LP in Cardwell, Montana
 KEXS-FM in Ravenwood, Missouri
 KFFB in Fairfield Bay, Arkansas
 KFLP-FM in Floydada, Texas
 KFMQ in Gallup, New Mexico
 KFSZ in Munds Park, Arizona
 KGIG-LP in Salida, California
 KHKS in Denton, Texas
 KIOC in Orange, Texas
 KIXO in Sulphur, Oklahoma
 KIYX in Sageville, Iowa
 KJOE in Slayton, Minnesota
 KKBI in Broken Bow, Oklahoma
 KKMV in Rupert, Idaho
 KKVR in Kerrville, Texas
 KLCI in Elk River, Minnesota
 KLEO in Kahaluu, Hawaii
 KLMI in Rock River, Wyoming
 KLSS-FM in Mason City, Iowa
 KMDX in San Angelo, Texas
 KMEL in San Francisco, California
 KNEX (FM) in Laredo, Texas
 KNFO in Basalt, Colorado
 KNUZ (FM) in San Saba, Texas
 KONR-LP in Anchorage, Alaska
 KOQL in Ashland, Missouri
 KPLM in Palm Springs, California
 KPQP in Panhandle, Texas
 KPYM in Matagorda, Texas
 KPZE-FM in Carlsbad, New Mexico
 KQDI-FM in Highwood, Montana
 KQLX-FM in Lisbon, North Dakota
 KQPT-LP in Sacramento, California
 KRAB in Greenacres, California
 KRRX in Burney, California
 KRZX in Redlands, Colorado
 KTGX in Owasso, Oklahoma
 KTTX in Brenham, Texas
 KURE-LP in Eloy, Arizona
 KWCQ in Condon, Oregon
 KWKZ in Charleston, Missouri
 KWUF-FM in Pagosa Springs, Colorado
 KWWV in Santa Margarita, California
 KXFF in Colorado City, Arizona
 KXHM in Refugio, Texas
 KXKU in Lyons, Kansas
 KXRR in Monroe, Louisiana
 KXXL in Moorcroft, Wyoming
 KYVZ in Atwood, Kansas
 KZCC-LP in Conroe, Texas
 KZFN in Moscow, Idaho
 WACD in Antigo, Wisconsin
 WAKT-LP in Toledo, Ohio
 WBBG in Niles, Ohio
 WBBX in Pocomoke City, Maryland
 WBLI in Patchogue, New York
 WBMH in Grove Hill, Alabama
 WCGH in Farmington Township, Pennsylvania
 WCNR in Keswick, Virginia
 WCOD-FM in Hyannis, Massachusetts
 WCWI in Adams, Wisconsin
 WDKS in Newburgh, Indiana
 WDSJ-LP in Ooltewah, Tennessee
 WFXH-FM in Hilton Head Island, South Carolina
 WHDQ in Claremont, New Hampshire
 WHKV in Sylvester, Georgia
 WJXQ in Charlotte, Michigan
 WJZS in Live Oak, Florida
 WLMX in Okeechobee, Florida
 WLRX in Vinton, Virginia
 WKTM in Soperton, Georgia
 WLZD-LP in Hazard, Kentucky
 WMEM (FM) in Presque Isle, Maine
 WMIL-FM in Waukesha, Wisconsin
 WMMY in Jefferson, North Carolina
 WMOR-FM in Morehead, Kentucky
 WMXU in Starkville, Mississippi
 WNGC in Arcade, Georgia
 WNKI in Corning, New York
 WNNA in Beaver Springs, Pennsylvania
 WOBS-LP in Orangeburg, South Carolina
 WOLS in Waxhaw, North Carolina
 WPDA in Jeffersonville, New York
 WQTL in Tallahassee, Florida
 WQTR-LP in Savannah, Tennessee
 WRKN in Picayune, Mississippi
 WRQE in Cumberland, Maryland
 WRRH in Hormigueros, Puerto Rico
 WRRX in Gulf Breeze, Florida
 WRZZ in Parkersburg, West Virginia
 WSCA-LP in Portsmouth, New Hampshire
 WSMI-FM in Litchfield, Illinois
 WSTH-FM in Alexander City, Alabama
 WTAK-FM in Hartselle, Alabama
 WTKK in Knightdale, North Carolina
 WTQT-LP in Baton Rouge, Louisiana
 WTUA in Saint Stephen, South Carolina
 WTZM in Tawas City, Michigan
 WUGM-LP in Muskegon, Michigan
 WUMR in Philadelphia, Pennsylvania
 WUSH in Poquoson, Virginia
 WVIS in Vieques, Puerto Rico
 WVLZ in Oliver Springs, Tennessee
 WVNO-FM in Mansfield, Ohio
 WWWY in North Vernon, Indiana
 WYCO-LP in York, Pennsylvania
 WYKY in Science Hill, Kentucky
 WYYS in Streator, Illinois

References 

Lists of radio stations by frequency